is a 2012 Japanese film. It is based on a manga of the same name and it is directed by the director Iizuka Ken. The film stars Kento Hayashi, Mirei Kiritani and released in Japanese cinemas on February 4, 2012.

Cast
 Kento Hayashi as Riku/Kou Ichinomiya
 Mirei Kiritani as Nino 
 Nana Katase as Maria
 Yu Shirota as Sister
 Natsumi Abe as P-ko
 Takaya Kamikawa as Seki Ichinomiya, the father of Riku and head of Ichinomiya company.
 Masahiro Takashima as Takayashiki, a government ministry member and a friend of Seki.
 Kazuyuki Asano as Takai, an Ichinomiya Company employee.
 Waka Inoue as Shimazaki, an Ichinomiya Company employee.
 Shun Oguri as the Village Chief
 Takayuki Yamada as Hoshi, a self-proclaimed rock star who is in love with Nino.

Filming location
create sets and shot in dry riverbed of Kinugawa River on Jōsō, Ibaraki, Japan for Arakawa Under the Bridge.

References

External links
  

2012 films
Films set in Tokyo
Japanese romance films
Live-action films based on manga
2010s Japanese films
2010s Japanese-language films